Town and Country is the second studio album by rock band Humble Pie, released in November 1969. It was released only in the UK.

Background
Conceived at band member Steve Marriott's 16th-century rural cottage "Arkesden" in Moreton, Essex, England, Town and Country offered a more pastoral approach than the more straightforward "heavy" progressive sound prevalent on their debut album, which had been released two months earlier. Like the band's early live shows, which opened with an acoustic set before returning with electric guitars in the second half of the show, Town and Country displayed a mix of acoustic ballads, country-rock, folk, blues, and hard rock. Unlike the debut LP, all four members of the band contributed solo compositions to the album. Peter Frampton played acoustic, Spanish, and lead guitars, and Marriott played guitar, sitar, percussion and keyboards, and bass guitar. Bassist Greg Ridley contributed guitar and tambourine, while Jerry Shirley handled his drum kit, a percussion saw on the first track, as well as tambourine, tablas, maracas, and Wurlitzer piano on his own composition "Cold Lady".

Content

Among the Marriott-composed tracks were his country-rock compositions "Every Mother's Son", "The Sad Bag Of Shakey Jake" and "Down Home Again". Frampton's compositions "Take Me Back", "Only You Can See" and "Home and Away" (a nominal co-write with Marriott and Ridley) nod toward the direction he would take in his later solo career. The album also included a cover of the Buddy Holly song "Heartbeat".

The album was produced by Andy Johns at Olympic Studios. Johns was the younger brother of producer Glyn Johns, who himself had a previous association with Marriott.

Most, if not all, of the material on the album dated back to recordings in the spring and early summer of 1969, when the band recorded as much as three albums' worth of material (the remaining recordings were eventually compiled and released in 1999 on the bands' The Immediate Years: Natural Born Boogie collection).

Release

While the band toured for the last half of the year to hone their onstage skills and generate interest with the record-buying public, their record label Immediate Records was on the verge of financial collapse. Immediate Records rush-released the album into UK record shops in November 1969, hoping it would enter the charts before the company went bankrupt. With no budget to promote it, the album quickly sank without a trace. The LP was not released at all in the US at the time, even though the band was currently on their first American tour, but it still managed to garner favorable attention on underground FM radio stations. As a result, the album bolstered the group's reputation, despite its lack of availability, the record company's imminent collapse, and disappointing sales.

After this album, Humble Pie returned to what would become their trademark "heavy" sound, and concentrated their efforts on breaking into the US market. Following Frampton's departure in 1971, the band would continue in the boogie rock vein until the remaining and replacement members disbanded in 1975.

Track listing
"Take Me Back" - (Frampton)  – 4:52
"The Sad Bag of Shakey Jake" - (Marriott)  – 2:59 (spelled as 'Shaky' on some issues)
"The Light of Love" - (Ridley)  – 3:00
"Cold Lady" - (Shirley)  – 3:22
"Down Home Again" - (Marriott)  – 2:56
"Ollie Ollie" - (Frampton, Marriott, Ridley, Shirley, Andy Johns)  – 0:50
"Every Mother's Son" - (Marriott)  – 5:43
"Heartbeat" - (Bob Montgomery, Norman Petty)  – 2:33
"Only You Can See" - (Frampton)  – 3:38
"Silver Tongue" - (Marriott)  – 3:20
"Home and Away" - (Marriott, Frampton, Ridley)  – 5:55
"79th Street Blues" (Humble Pie) - 3:00 (bonus track for CD release)
"Greg's Song" (Ridley) - 4:29 (bonus track for CD release)

Personnel
Humble Pie
Steve Marriott – guitar (2, 4, 7, 8), Leslie guitar (10), sitar (3), vocals (2, 4, 5, 7-10), organ (10, 11), Wurlitzer piano (2, 11), percussion (1), hammer and nail brandy bottle (1), maracas (2), drums (9)
Peter Frampton – vocals (1-5, 8, 9, 11), guitar (1, 5, 9, 11), lead guitar (2, 7, 8, 10), Spanish guitar (3), bass (3), drums (4), Wurlitzer piano (9), plastic-cup (1)
Greg Ridley – bass (1, 2, 4, 5, 8-11), guitar (3), vocals (2-5, 8, 11), tambourine (1)
Jerry Shirley – drums (2, 5, 8, 10, 11), saw (1), tambourine (2), tablas (3), maracas (4), Wurlitzer piano (4)

Technical team
Engineers: Andrew Johns, Rob, John, Happy Keith
Arranged by Humble Pie

References

1969 albums
Humble Pie (band) albums
Albums produced by Andy Johns
Albums with cover art by Hipgnosis
Albums recorded at Olympic Sound Studios
Immediate Records albums
Folk rock albums by English artists